Macmillan of Canada was a Canadian publishing house.

The company was founded in 1905 as the Canadian arm of the English publisher Macmillan. At that time it was known as the "Macmillan Company of Canada Ltd." In the course of its existence the name changed to "Macmillan of Canada" and "Macmillan Canada".

Macmillan of Canada was sold to Maclean-Hunter in 1973, who, some seven years later, sold it to Gage Educational Publishing Company. The company was most influential in the 1970s and 1980s under editor and publisher Douglas Gibson, who brought many of Canada's most prominent and influential writers of the era to the company; however, his departure for McClelland & Stewart in 1986 greatly weakened the company's fiction division as the majority of its writers followed Gibson to the competing company.

In 1998, Macmillan Canada, as it was then known, became an imprint of CDG Books, which was formed as a joint venture of Gage and US publisher Hungry Minds.  CDG was purchased in 2002 by John Wiley & Sons, who had acquired Hungry Minds the year before. At this time Macmillan Canada ceased to exist either as an imprint or a publishing house.

Noted authors
Over its nearly 100 years of existence Macmillan's published authors such as:
 Morley Callaghan
 Robertson Davies
 Mazo de la Roche
 Mavis Gallant
 Grey Owl
 Stephen Leacock
 Hugh MacLennan
 Preston Manning
 W.O. Mitchell
 Alice Munro
 E.J. Pratt
 Carol Shields
 Jack Hodgins
 J. T. Crawford
 J. E. Dean
 W. A. Jackson
Former presidents of Macmillan of Canada included Hugh Eayrs, John M. Gray, Hugh Kane, George W. Gilmour, and J. William Baker

References

External links
 Macmillan Company of Canada fonds, McMaster University Library

Publishing companies established in 1905
Canadian companies disestablished in 2002
Defunct publishing companies of Canada
Book publishing companies of Canada
Canadian companies established in 1905
Publishing companies disestablished in 2002